, (born September 26, 1972) is a Japanese baseball player. He is a right-handed pitcher in Japan's Nippon Professional Baseball for the Saitama Seibu Lions.

Career statistics

Bold indicates league leader; statistics current as of December 25, 2013

External links
 

1972 births
Living people
People from Wakayama (city)
Japanese baseball players
Nippon Professional Baseball pitchers
Seibu Lions players
Saitama Seibu Lions players
Nippon Professional Baseball MVP Award winners
Japanese baseball coaches
Nippon Professional Baseball coaches